S. Kabo ( -  in Watutau), was the fourth regent of Poso Regency, Central Sulawesi, Indonesia; who ruled from 1957 to 1959. He is the third regent who has no military background.

He graduated from Poso's Holland Inlandsche School and OSVIA in Makassar, South Sulawesi. In September 1945, S. Kabo appointed as Head of Government of Poso Regency. He died on June 26, 1982 in Wanga.

References

1910 births
1982 deaths
Indonesian politicians
Indonesian military personnel